Kamm and Schellinger Brewery, also known as 100 Center Complex, is a historic brewery complex located at Mishawaka, St. Joseph County, Indiana.  The complex consists of the original Brewery Building, the Stable Building (c. 1855), and the Boiler House (c. 1870) with a 262 foot tall brick chimney stack.  The original Brewery Building was built in 1853, and is a four-story brick building with additions constructed about 1870 and 1875.  It features an elaborate metal cornice, pediment and colonnaded cupola. The brewery cease operations in 1951.

It was listed on the National Register of Historic Places in 1979.

References

Industrial buildings and structures on the National Register of Historic Places in Indiana
Industrial buildings completed in 1853
Buildings and structures in St. Joseph County, Indiana
National Register of Historic Places in St. Joseph County, Indiana